Rennbahnweg  is a station on  of the Vienna U-Bahn. It is located in the Donaustadt District and opened in 2006.

References

External links 
 

Buildings and structures in Donaustadt
Railway stations opened in 2006
2006 establishments in Austria
Vienna U-Bahn stations
Railway stations in Austria opened in the 21st century